Marano Ticino is a comune (municipality) in the Province of Novara in the Italian region Piedmont, located about  northeast of Turin and about  north of Novara.

Marano Ticino borders the following municipalities: Divignano, Mezzomerico, Oleggio, Pombia, and Vizzola Ticino.

References

Cities and towns in Piedmont